Iskoolmates is a youth-oriented magazine and debate program airs every Thursday 8:00 p.m. to 9:00 p.m. (PST) on PTV. It aired from June 23, 2015 to present. The program presents a broader perspective on issues concerning the Filipino youth. An avenue for intelligent discourse and social awareness, the show empowers today's young freethinkers with information—enabling Pinoy teens to voice their views on matters that impact their lives as active stakeholders of the future. It is produced by the PTV Public Affairs Division since June 23, 2015.

Year 1 Episodes

Year 2 Episodes

Year 3 Episodes

Year 4 Episodes

Year 5 Episodes

Year 6 Episodes

Year 7 Episodes

Year 8 Episodes

Specials

 2020 International Youth Day (aired August 12, 2020, via facebook live) – Iskoolmates Hosts Gab Bayan, Tricia Bersano and Sky Quizon discussed some issues concerning the youth  like how to protect the children during pandemic and the current situation of education, these are in line with the celebration of the International Youth Day 2020.
 2019 International Youth Day (aired August 12, 2019, via facebook live) – in partnership with the National Alliance of Youth Leaders, Iskoolmates Alumnus Jules Guiang and Iskoolmates Host and incumbent NAYL President Tricia Bersano hosted the facebook live discussion on transforming education in line with the celebration of the International Youth Day 2019.
 2018 Philippine Inter-Collegiate Debating Championship (aired June 21, 2018) – Marked the 100th episode of Iskoolmates is the largest and most prestigious locally organized and locally hosted debate tournament in the country. The tournament follows the Asian Parliamentary format of debating in seven preliminary rounds, and four Finals Series rounds to determine the best debaters, adjudicators and public speakers in the country. It is a world-class tournament that focuses on the efficiency of its administration as well as the well-being of its participants.
 Sangguniang Kabataan Special Edition (aired May 10, 2018) – The first Sangguniang Kabataan Debate on National Television participated by SK Chairperson Candidates from the largest barangay in the Philippines, Barangay 176 Bagong Silang, Caloocan in cooperation with the Commission on Elections and National Youth Commission. 
 Bulilit Day (aired October 23, 2016) – Iskoolmates Outreach Program to the children of Onesimo Bulilit Foundation in Tondo, Manila. This is our way of fulfilling our corporate social responsibility as we not only aim to share knowledge with our audience but to show that we make a difference in the lives of the Filipino youth.
 Iskoolmates 1st Anniversary Special (aired July 10, 2016) – in celebration of its 1st anniversary, Iskoolmates with the support of Metrobank Foundation and Antipolo mobile teachers organized an outreach program. The participants were the members of the Dumagat Tribe living in Purok Tayabasan, Sitio San Ysiro, San Jose, Antipolo and Purok Mainit a nearby community. There were fun games with fun prizes and a feeding program. But the highlight of the activity is the distribution of 100 school kits for everyone. Each of them received a school kit that comes with a notebook, two pad papers, two pencils, a ballpen, a box of crayons, sharpener, ruler and eraser.
 2016 Philippine Inter-Collegiate Debating Championship (aired April 24, 2016) – is the largest and most prestigious locally organized and locally hosted debate tournament in the country. The tournament follows the Asian Parliamentary format of debating in seven preliminary rounds, and four Finals Series rounds to determine the best debaters, adjudicators and public speakers in the country. It is a world-class tournament that focuses on the efficiency of its administration as well as the well-being of its participants.
 EDSA 30 (aired February 21, 2016) – The special episode in partnership with EDSA People Power Commission discussed the relevance of People Power thirty years after the revolution. The show featured debates from UP University Student Council, students from different schools and universities was also invited as part of the live audience and joined the discussion.
 Bangkarunungan (aired December 20, 2015) – A project that brings education through boat. Iskoolmates and Teacher Adrian, the founder of Bangkarunungan and other volunteers traveled by boat to Sitio Sampaloc, a poor coastal community in Zambales to teach basic reading and distribute educational materials to the children.

Segments
 Iskooltour – is a short narration of the school/university’s historical background, notable achievements and what it has to offer to the students including facilities and their core values. 
 What's on Your Mind – is the social media segment. The host reads the comments and opinions of the netizens regarding the topic. 
 BidaKabataan – inspiring and extraordinary stories of the youth.
 Share Ko Lang – is a short video presentation of youth activities of any group, organization or individuals.
 Iskoolmates Campus Journal – is  a feature of school events and activities involving the youth and aims to encourage the students to participate in extra-curricular activities that can also help them build networks and acquire new knowledge about important topics and issues in society.
 Iskoolmates Breaktime/Live – is a short discussion of the hosts via online, youtube channel or facebook live to a certain issues.
 Iskoolmates Field Trip – educational tour in different places

Hosts
 Gab Bayan (August 2018 – present)
 Tricia Bersano (August 2018 – present)
 Gina Donato (December 2021 – present)

Alumni
 Eurwin Canzana (December 2021 – June 2022)
 Sky Quizon (August 2018 – August 2021)
 Nico Estibar (June 2019 – December 2020)
 Sunny Kim (November 2019 – December 2020)
 Jules Guiang (June 2015 – August 2018)
 JV Cruz (June 2015 – July 2018)
 Mico Aytona (August 2015 – April 2018)
 Hessa Gonzales (June 2015 – September 2017)
 Kat Medina (January 2016 – December 2017)

Accolades

See also 
 People's Television Network

External links

References 

People's Television Network original programming
Philippine television talk shows
Filipino-language television shows
2015 Philippine television series debuts
2010s Philippine television series
2020s Philippine television series